Mark D. Rasch is an attorney and author, working in the areas of corporate and government cybersecurity, privacy and incident response. He is the former Chief Security Evangelist for Verizon Communications  after having been Vice President, Deputy General Counsel, and Chief Privacy and Data Security Officer for SAIC. From 1983 to 1992, Rasch worked at the U.S. Department of Justice within the Criminal Division's Fraud Section. Rasch earned a J.D. in 1983 from State University of New York at Buffalo and is a 1976 graduate of the Bronx High School of Science.

He prosecuted Robert Tappan Morris in the case of United States v. Morris (1991).  He was an amicus curiae related to data encryption in Bernstein v. United States, and prosecuted Presidential candidate Lyndon LaRouche, and organized crime figures in New York associated with the Gambino crime family  He also helped uncover the individual responsible for the so-called "Craigslist murder" in Boston.

Rasch has been a regular contributor to SecurityCurrent and SecurityFocus and Security Boulevard on issues related to law and technology and is a regular contributor to Wired Magazine. He was also a longtime columnist for StorefrontBacktalk, a now-defunct publication that tracked global retail technology. He has appeared on or been quoted by MSNBC, Fox News, CNN, The New York Times, Forbes, PBS, The Washington Post, NPR  and other national and international media.

Books

Notes and references

1958 births
American lawyers
Living people
People associated with computer security